AMP Building usually refers to buildings used by AMP Limited. It may refer to:

AMP Building, Brisbane
AMP Building, Hobart
AMP Building, Perth
AMP Building, Rockhampton
AMP Building, Sydney
AMP Building, Wellington
AMP Centre, Sydney
Magnetic House, the first AMP Building in Townsville
Australian Mutual Provident Society Building, the second AMP Building in Townsville
MacArthur Chambers, former AMP Building in Brisbane